Tricyrtis macropoda is an East Asian plant species in the lily family native to China, Korea, and Japan.

References

macropoda
Plants described in 1868
Flora of China
Flora of Eastern Asia